Charles Peter Keep Edwards (born 1 October 1969) is an English actor with a career in theatre, TV, and film, most notable for playing Michael Gregson in Downton Abbey (2012–2013), Dr Alexander McDonald in The Terror (2018), Sir Martin Charteris in The Crown (2019-2020), and Lord Celebrimbor in The Lord of the Rings: The Rings of Power (2022).

Early life
Edwards was born 1 October 1969, in the town of Haslemere in Surrey, England, and grew up in Grayshott, Hampshire.

He is the youngest of four sons of Sally Anne Lake Coghlan and Ronald Derek Keep Edwards.

Education
From an early age, Edwards attended Amesbury School in Hindhead, Surrey. Edwards was further educated at Winchester College, Hampshire, from 1983 to 1987, where he boarded in Moberly's house. His father, Ronald Edwards, also attended the College from 1948—1953 as did his older brother, Simon, who attended from 1974—1978. Both father and sons boarded at the same House.

Edwards went on to pursue acting at the Guildhall School of Music and Drama, from which he graduated in 1992.

Career

Theatre
Edwards debut in acting was on stage as a gingerbread man in a play of Hansel and Gretel. Edwards' first professional theatre engagement was in Blithe Spirit at age 24.  Since then he has appeared in many shows such as The Duchess of Malfi, Hay Fever, Private Lives and The Apple Cart.

Edwards received acclaim for his Broadway debut performance as Richard Hannay in the 2005 play of The 39 Steps, in the first London production in 2006, and in the first US productions in 2007 (Boston) and 2008 (New York City).  He is the only actor from the London production to transfer to the US productions. Edwards concluded his run in the play on 6 July 2008.

He has made appearances in a number of Shakespeare plays, including Peter Hall's production of Twelfth Night at the Royal National Theatre (Cottesloe auditorium) as Sir Andrew Aguecheek; as Benedick in Much Ado About Nothing at Shakespeare's Globe; The Merchant of Venice; and A Midsummer Night's Dream, playing Oberon to Judi Dench's Titania. For his performance in Much Ado About Nothing, Edwards was shortlisted for Best Actor at the 2011 Evening Standard Theatre Awards. He also received a WhatsOnStage Award nomination, in 2012, for his performance in Twelfth Night.

In 2012, Edwards played the lead role of George VI in the original stage play of The King's Speech on a nationwide tour and also the West End, gaining positive feedback from critics across the board. Drama critic Michael Billington wrote of his performance, "Edwards, who has been edging towards stardom for several seasons, has now unequivocally arrived." Later in 2012, he took on the role of Conservative Whip Jack Weatherill in James Graham's This House at the National Theatre. Towards the end of the year, he was shortlisted again for Best Actor at the Evening Standard Theatre Awards for his performance in both plays.

In 2013, Edwards starred as Charles Marsden in a Simon Godwin adaptation of Eugene O'Neill's Pulitzer prize winning play Strange Interlude at the National's Lyttleton Theatre. In 2014, Edwards co-starred in Michael Blakemore's adaptation of Coward's Blithe Spirit, opposite Dame Angela Lansbury. He played Richard II in Simon Godwin's production at Shakespeare's Globe, and Henry Trebell in Harley Granville Barker's play Waste at the National Theatre, both in 2015.

In March 2017, he starred as Henry Higgins in the Brisbane and Melbourne seasons of Lerner and Loewe's My Fair Lady, presented by Opera Australia and John Frost and directed by Dame Julie Andrews.

Edwards worked with playwright James Graham again in 2021, playing Gore Vidal in Best of Enemies at the Young Vic. He received a Laurence Olivier Award nomination for Best Actor the following year.

TV and film

In 2002, he played David, also known as King Edward VIII, in the feature-length TV drama Bertie and Elizabeth for ITV.

In 2011, he played Michael Palin in Holy Flying Circus, a dramatisation of the controversy surrounding Monty Python's Life of Brian. In October 2012, Edwards appeared in the third season of the television series Downton Abbey as Michael Gregson. Edwards appeared in the 2013 film, Diana, charting the final few years of Diana, Princess of Wales, where he played Diana's private secretary Patrick Jephson. He made an appearance in BBC series Sherlock, as David Welsborough, on the first episode of the fourth series which aired 1 January 2017 titled 'The Six Thatchers'. Also in 2017, he took on the lead role of the fictional King Henry IX in the TV series Henry IX for Sky channel GOLD.

Edwards' other film and television credits include Batman Begins, An Ideal Husband, Monarch of the Glen, The Halcyon, Mansfield Park, Murder Rooms: The Dark Beginnings of Sherlock Holmes, The Shell Seekers, Colditz and Midsomer Murders.

In 2019 and 2020, he appeared in the third and fourth seasons of the widely acclaimed Netflix series The Crown as Martin Charteris, Queen Elizabeth II's private secretary, taking over the role from Harry Hadden-Paton, who played a younger Charteris in the first two seasons. In 2021, Edwards worked on a New Zealand TV mini series Under The Vines, filmed in Central Otago wine region of the South Island and released on January 19, 2022. 

In 2022, Edwards played the key role of Celebrimbor, the elven smith responsible for forging the Rings of Power in The Lord of the Rings: The Rings of Power.

Filmography

Awards and nominations

References

External links 
 
 Charles Edwards' London

1969 births
20th-century English male actors
21st-century English male actors
Living people
Alumni of the Guildhall School of Music and Drama
English male film actors
English male stage actors
English male television actors
Male actors from Surrey
People educated at Winchester College
People from Haslemere